SWF (ShockWave Flash / Small Web Format) is an Adobe Flash file format.
SWF may also refer to:

 SWF Seeks Same a 1990 novel by John Lutz
 South Woodham Ferrers, a town in Essex, UK
 Sovereign wealth fund of a government
 Spring Web Flow, for rich web applications
 Standard Written Form of the Cornish language
 Stewart International Airport (IATA code), Hudson Valley, New York, US
 Südwestfunk, a former German radio station
 Sere language, by ISO 639-3 language code
 Center for the Filipino Language (Sentro ng Wikang Filipino)
 Scottish Women's Football
 Scottish Widows Fund